Sharon Oreck is an American film, music video and commercial producer. She has Oscar and Grammy nominations in addition to other awards. She is credited with coining the term populence. Oreck has been married to cinematographer Bill Pope since the 1980s. She was a cinema student at Los Angeles City College in Los Angeles.

Career as a producer

Oreck began her production career in 1972, working on low budget genre movies, until she line produced the evacuation of Phnom Penh for The Killing Fields. From 1984 until 2000, she was the owner-operator of O Pictures, which produced many music videos, commercials, short films and documentaries.
 
Since 1984, she has produced over 600 music videos for performers in different genres including Tony Bennett, Rosanne Cash, Eurythmics, Ice-T, Michael Jackson, Mick Jagger, Madonna, Metallica, Bette Midler, Sting and U2.

Oreck is the producer of the 2007 film 14 Women, a documentary that tells the story of 14 women in the United States Senate. The film premiered at the Silverdocs festival in June 2007.

She has written the memoir Video Slut:  How I Shoved Madonna Off an Olympic High Dive, Got Prince into a Pair of Tiny Purple Woolen Underpants, Ran Away from Michael Jackson's Dad, and Got a Waterfall to Flow Backward So I Could Bring Rock Videos to the Masses  which was published by Faber and Faber in May 2010.

Filmography
14 Women – ( Producer / 2007 / Released / )
Skipped Parts – ( Producer / 2001 / Released / )
Mugshot – ( Producer / 1996 / Released / )
Below the Belt – ( Production Assistant / 1980 / Released / Atlantic Releasing Corporation )

TV credits
Coca-Cola Pop Music "Backstage Pass to Summer" ( 1991 / Released ): Segment Producer
Imagining America ( 1989 / Released ): Producer

Selected music videos

Awards and honors
Sharon Oreck was nominated for an Academy Award in 1985 and a Grammy Award in 1991. She has won two Women in Film Awards (1989 and 1991) and twenty MTV Video Music Awards.

She is credited with coining the term populence, which refers to the way contemporary artists bring together populism and opulence in abstract painting.

References

External links
 
 
 NY Times – Sharon Oreck

1955 births
Living people
Los Angeles City College alumni
California Democrats
Businesspeople from Los Angeles
Film producers from California